Povorot is a rural locality (a settlement) in Selenginsky District, Republic of Buryatia, Russia. The population was 181 as of 2010. There are 5 streets.

Geography 
Povorot is located 46 km south of Gusinoozyorsk (the district's administrative centre) by road. Novoselenginsk is the nearest rural locality.

References 

Rural localities in Selenginsky District